The Djebel Lkest (Tashelhit: ⴰⴷⵔⴰⵔ ⵏ ⵍⴽⵙⵜ Adrar n Lkst; Arabic: جبل لكست) is a mountain in the Anti-Atlas. Its summit Afa n Tmzgadiwin rises to 2,359 meters above sea level, making it one of the highest mountains of the Anti-Atlas in southern Morocco.

References

Mountains of Morocco
Geography of Souss-Massa